April Jeanette Mendez (born March 19, 1987) is an American author and retired professional wrestler. She is best known for her time in WWE under the ring name AJ Lee. She is currently an executive producer and color commentator for WOW – Women of Wrestling.

Mendez began her professional wrestling career in 2007 in New Jersey's independent circuit. She signed with WWE in 2009 and spent two years in its developmental branch, Florida Championship Wrestling, before her promotion to the main roster.  In 2012, she rose to prominence through storylines with her "mentally unstable" character, such as high-profile relationships and a three-month stint as the General Manager of Raw. In subsequent years, she won the Divas Championship a record-tying three times and held the title for an overall record of 406 days. She also won the Slammy Award for Diva of the Year in 2012 and 2014, and readers of Pro Wrestling Illustrated voted her Woman of the Year from 2012 to 2014. She retired from in-ring performing in 2015. Mendez's 2017 memoir, Crazy Is My Superpower, was a New York Times Best Seller.

Early life 
April Jeanette Mendez was born on March 19, 1987, in Union City, New Jersey. Her mother, Janet Acevedo, was a homemaker and later a home health aide, while her father, Robert Mendez, was an automotive engineer. She is the youngest of three children, and is of Puerto Rican descent. In describing her childhood, Mendez said her family struggled with poverty, mental illness, and drug addiction. They frequently moved between apartments, sometimes living in motels or their car when they could not afford rent.

Her brother's interest in World Wrestling Entertainment (WWE) influenced her to become a professional wrestler. With inspiration from WWE's female wrestlers, especially Lita, she cemented her ambition at 12 years old. In 2005, she graduated from Memorial High School in West New York, New Jersey. She attended New York University's Tisch School of the Arts, where she majored in film and television production, until family and financial issues led to her dropping out six months into her studies. Afterward, she started working full-time to afford wrestling training. As an homage to her brother, who was in the U.S. Army, she occasionally wore camouflage wrestling attire.

Mendez was diagnosed with bipolar disorder, a condition her mother also suffered from, around the age of 20. She had previously experienced adverse effects from a misdiagnosis of depression, and overdosed on antidepressants and painkillers. This event, which she considers a suicide attempt, caused her to seek proper treatment and the right diagnosis. She credits the condition for giving her the bravery to achieve her goals.

Professional wrestling career

Early career (2007–2009) 
In March 2007, Mendez enrolled in a wrestling school close to her home, where she was trained by Jay Lethal. Around late 2007, she began to perform on the New Jersey independent circuit under the ring name Miss April. She joined the New Jersey-based promotion Women Superstars Uncensored (WSU) in October 2008. After little success in her first months, Miss April formed a tag team with Brooke Carter, who together captured the WSU Tag Team Championship in February 2009. She also won the annual WSU/National Wrestling Superstars King and Queen of the Ring tournament alongside Jay Lethal two months later. In May, she left WSU upon signing with WWE and relinquished her championship.

World Wrestling Entertainment / WWE

Florida Championship Wrestling and NXT (2009–2011) 
Mendez paid US$1,500 to attend a WWE tryout camp in May 2009, where she signed a contract. She reported to Florida Championship Wrestling (FCW), WWE's developmental territory, and debuted under the ring name April Lee at a house show in late July. Shortly thereafter, her name was changed to AJ Lee. In February 2010, AJ defeated Serena Mancini to win the Queen of FCW title. A few months later, AJ was eliminated from a tournament that determined the inaugural FCW Divas Champion; she engaged in a feud with the winner, Naomi Knight, and her character became a heel (bad guy). In November, AJ lost the Queen of FCW title to Rosa Mendes. AJ then defeated Naomi for the FCW Divas Championship in December, which made her the first to win both titles available to FCW's female wrestlers. She held the championship until April 2011, when she lost it to Aksana.

While in FCW, Mendez took part in the third season of NXT beginning in September 2010. The show mixed professional wrestling and reality competition formats as six female participants from FCW competed to be WWE's "next breakout star". Primo was assigned as her "WWE Pro", the role of her mentor in the storyline. She performed as a face (good guy) on the show and WWE adapted her "nerd" fandom to her character. Throughout the season, a relationship between AJ and Primo was teased, with them ultimately kissing on the finale. She also developed an on-screen friendship with fellow competitor, Kaitlyn. On November 23, AJ was eliminated in third place.

Various relationships and Raw General Manager (2011–2013) 
AJ made her main roster debut on the May 27, 2011, episode of SmackDown as part of a tag team with Kaitlyn, referring to themselves as "The Chickbusters". Along with their mentor Natalya, they feuded with the trio of Alicia Fox, Tamina Snuka, and Rosa Mendes for two months. In late July, AJ began a brief storyline on NXT Redemption as the girlfriend of Hornswoggle and feuded with Maxine. Meanwhile, on SmackDown, she was attacked by Natalya, who turned on her protégé and allied with Beth Phoenix to form the Divas of Doom. AJ and Kaitlyn repeatedly lost to the Divas of Doom over the following months, upsetting Kaitlyn.

By November 2011, AJ was placed in an on-screen romance with Daniel Bryan, who won the World Heavyweight Championship the next month and developed heel traits. Despite AJ's declaration of love for Bryan, Bryan avoided saying he loved her in return. On January 13, 2012, while accompanying Bryan for his title defense, she was accidentally struck by Big Show and carried off on a stretcher as part of the storyline. She returned on February 3, preventing Bryan from being attacked by Big Show. In March, Bryan started acting verbally abusive towards AJ but she stood by him. At WrestleMania XXVIII on April 1, after sharing a "good luck kiss" with Bryan, he was surprised by Sheamus and defeated in 18 seconds. Bryan blamed AJ for his loss of the World Heavyweight Championship and ended their relationship. AJ made multiple attempts to mend their relationship but Bryan spurned her and left her distraught. As a result, she attacked Natalya and Kaitlyn when they attempted to comfort her, marking her character's transition to "mentally unstable".

AJ turned her affections to Bryan's rival and WWE Champion CM Punk as well as Kane. At No Way Out on June 17, AJ interfered in a triple threat match for the WWE Championship between Punk, Bryan, and Kane, helping Punk retain his title by distracting Kane. As Bryan and Punk's feud progressed, AJ was announced as the special guest referee for their title match at Money in the Bank. Bryan made advances on AJ in an attempt to influence her, however, she focused her attention on Punk. Enraged by his disinterest on the July 2 episode of Raw, she interfered in his match and shoved him, along with Bryan, through a ringside table. After they made amends, she proposed to him but Bryan countered with a proposal of his own; Punk rejected her offer and she slapped both men. At Money in the Bank on July 15, as referee, AJ counted Punk's pinfall on Bryan, resulting in a successful title defense for Punk; as Punk celebrated over a fallen Bryan, AJ was left alone. The next night, Bryan proposed to her again and she accepted.

During the exchange of vows at Raw 1000, AJ announced that WWE chairman Vince McMahon had offered her the job of Raw General Manager and left Bryan at the altar. Her on-screen authority role began on July 30, where she alleged that Bryan only wanted the legal leverage to have her committed and forced him to undergo his own psychological evaluation. AJ continued to exact revenge on both Bryan and Punk throughout her tenure, denying their requests and booking them in matches against their wishes. On August 27 and September 24, she was involved in separate altercations with Vickie Guerrero and Paul Heyman, in which she attacked them. AJ was reprimanded by the board of directors, and the two demanded the General Manager position for themselves, deeming her too childish.

AJ stepped down from her General Manager duties on October 22, becoming embroiled in a scandal storyline with John Cena. Vickie Guerrero alleged that they had an affair and presented various material over the next month to support her claim. AJ and Cena denied the accusations and eventually formed a relationship, though Cena grew reluctant due to her behavior. Meanwhile, Cena feuded with Vickie Guerrero's client, Dolph Ziggler, over Ziggler's Money in the Bank contract. During their match at TLC on December 16, AJ turned heel by interfering and pushing Cena off a ladder, causing him to lose. She solidified a relationship with Ziggler the next night on Raw and they teamed together against Cena and Guerrero in the main event, which ended in disqualification after the debuting Big E Langston attacked Cena on her behalf. Subsequently accompanied by Langston as her bodyguard, she explained that Cena had "toyed with" her emotions and "broke her heart", so she helped Ziggler "break" him.

In March 2013, AJ's storyline rivalry with ex-boyfriend Daniel Bryan was reignited when they traded insults backstage. She and Langston assisted Ziggler in victories over Bryan and his tag team partner Kane, which led to Ziggler and Langston losing to them in a WWE Tag Team Championship match at WrestleMania 29 on April 7, despite her interference. The next night on Raw, she and Langston accompanied Ziggler as he cashed in his Money in the Bank contract on Alberto Del Rio to win the World Heavyweight Championship.

Divas Champion and retirement (2013–2015) 
AJ won a battle royal on April 22, 2013, to become the number one contender to Kaitlyn's WWE Divas Championship. Kaitlyn soon began a storyline where she received gifts from a secret admirer. On June 10, after setting up Langston to pose as the admirer, AJ revealed it to be a mind game, berated Kaitlyn and left her in tears. Six days later at Payback, AJ defeated Kaitlyn to capture her first Divas Championship. While she continued to mock Kaitlyn, they participated in the first ever in-ring contract signing for a Divas Championship bout. At Money in the Bank on July 14, AJ won their rematch but later in the show caused Ziggler to lose his own rematch for the World Heavyweight Championship. She hit his opponent, Alberto Del Rio, with her title belt to protect him from further head injury, prompting a disqualification. Angered by her unwanted action, Ziggler ended their relationship. She exacted revenge by costing him another match, then attacked him with Langston. On August 2, Langston was banned from attending her matches. However, AJ again retained the title from Kaitlyn, who was betrayed by Layla. Kaitlyn and Ziggler ultimately joined to defeat AJ and Langston in a mixed tag team match at SummerSlam on August 18.

On August 26, AJ interrupted the cast of Total Divas during a post-match segment and insulted them. She later vowed to defeat every member of the cast, and enlisted Tamina Snuka as her bodyguard. Throughout the remainder of the year, AJ successfully defended the championship against the trio of Brie Bella, Naomi, and Natalya at Night of Champions, Brie Bella at both Battleground and Hell in a Cell, and Natalya at TLC. She also captained a team at Survivor Series in a traditional seven-on-seven elimination tag team match against the entire cast, which her team lost.

In January 2014, AJ became the longest-reigning Divas Champion at the time. After fending off title contenders Cameron and Natalya, AJ renewed her on-screen rivalry with SmackDown General Manager Vickie Guerrero, who forced her to defend the Divas Championship in a 14-woman match at WrestleMania XXX. AJ won the match on April 6, marking the first time the championship had been contested for at WWE's flagship event. The next night on Raw, AJ challenged the debuting Paige to an impromptu title match and was defeated, ending her then-record reign at 295 days. Mendez was subsequently granted time off.

Upon her return on June 30, AJ switched to a face role and was no longer accompanied by Tamina. She challenged Paige to an impromptu rematch and won back the Divas Championship. They started pretending to be best friends in a facetious manner. When AJ retained the title from Paige at Battleground, their act escalated into unprovoked attacks. At SummerSlam on August 17, AJ lost the championship to Paige. Their storyline was then intertwined with that of Nikki and Brie Bella, at the behest of Stephanie McMahon, who granted Nikki a championship opportunity. A triple threat match ensued at Night of Champions on September 21, where AJ became a record-tying three-time Divas Champion. Her feud against Paige concluded with a victory at Hell in a Cell in October. She changed focus to Nikki Bella, whose sister, Brie, was involved as her "personal assistant". AJ quickly lost the championship to Nikki at Survivor Series on November 23, due to a distraction by Brie. After losing the rematch at TLC the following month, Mendez took time off to heal a pre-existing neck injury.

In February 2015, Mendez criticized WWE's treatment of its female wrestlers, stating they receive only a fraction of the wages and screen time of their male counterparts despite having generated record-selling merchandise and several top-rated segments. Her comments addressed WWE executive Stephanie McMahon, who thanked her for the public statement. WWE chairman and CEO Vince McMahon acknowledged the issue.

AJ returned on the March 2 episode of Raw, saving her former rival Paige from an attack by Nikki and Brie Bella. AJ and Paige allied together to defeat the Bella Twins at WrestleMania 31 on March 29. A six-woman tag team match the next night on Raw wound up being her final match, as WWE announced her retirement from in-ring competition on April 3. In her memoir, Mendez stated that permanent damage to her cervical spine, and the fulfillment of her goals led to the decision. She had also "felt caught in the middle" between WWE and her husband CM Punk following his controversial departure in January 2014 but continued to wrestle for as long as she could.

Women of Wrestling (2021–present) 

After six years away from the wrestling industry, Mendez joined the WOW – Women of Wrestling promotion as an executive producer in October 2021, serving alongside Jeanie Buss. This announcement coincided with WOW entering into a multi-year distribution agreement with ViacomCBS, the biggest distribution opportunity in the U.S. and abroad in the history of women's professional wrestling. Since September 2022, Mendez has provided color commentary for WOW's syndicated weekly television program.

Professional wrestling persona 

Mendez's character is prominently associated with her mentally unstable gimmick used during her time in WWE. This persona, labeled the "crazy chick", caused Mendez to feel that she "was hiding in plain sight" due to her bipolar disorder. Her diagnosis was not publicly disclosed until the publicity for her memoir, nor was WWE aware of her condition.

The "Lee" in her ring name was derived from Wendee Lee, a voice actress in her favorite anime, Cowboy Bebop. She wore various ring attire styles throughout her career, but settled on a T-shirt, jean shorts, and Chuck Taylor All-Stars, as it reflected her practical style. She also wanted her look to be distinctive and easily replicated for cosplay. When performing, she skipped as she entered ringside, and sometimes used it to taunt an opponent during a match. She primarily performed the octopus hold submission as her finishing maneuver, named "Black Widow" in reference to the Marvel Comics character.

Other wrestling media 
In 2012, Mendez became the first female winner of WWE's annual Superstar Challenge video game tournament, where sixteen wrestlers competed in WWE '12 at WrestleMania XXVIII Axxess. This is recognized by Guinness World Records, as part of their Gamer's Edition. Her WWE character was portrayed by Thea Trinidad in the 2019 film Fighting with My Family.

Writing and advocacy 
Mendez wrote Crazy Is My Superpower: How I Triumphed by Breaking Bones, Breaking Hearts, and Breaking the Rules, a memoir published by Crown Archetype on April 4, 2017. The book covers her upbringing and career in professional wrestling. It debuted at No. 10 on The New York Times Best Seller list for hardcover non-fiction. Upon release, she described writing as "very much the next chapter" of her life, and had begun work on a second book.

Mendez formed a writing partnership with actress Aimee Garcia in 2019. Their first project was the comic book series GLOW vs. The Babyface, based on the television series GLOW; the first of four issues was published by IDW Publishing in November 2019. In 2020, they created the production company Scrappy Heart Productions, dedicated to elevating diverse voices through storytelling. They wrote the Dungeons & Dragons four-issue limited series At the Spine of the World; the first issue was published by IDW in November 2020. Alongside John Swetman, they co-wrote the screenplay for the 2022 Netflix film Blade of the 47 Ronin.

In 2020, Mendez made the Black List's inaugural Latinx TV list for her television pilot script, Home. In June 2021, she wrote a story in the first issue of DC Comics' Wonder Woman: Black and Gold, an anthology mini-series celebrating Wonder Woman's 80th anniversary.

An advocate for mental health awareness and animal welfare, Mendez has served as an ambassador for organizations such as the National Alliance on Mental Illness (NAMI), the Jed Foundation, and the American Society for the Prevention of Cruelty to Animals. In 2018, she was awarded with NAMI's Multicultural Outreach Award.

Personal life 
Mendez regards herself as a tomboy and has an interest in comic books, anime, and video games. She has the numerical date of her first WWE Divas Championship win tattooed in tally marks on the back of her neck.

Mendez married fellow professional wrestler Phil Brooks, better known as CM Punk, on June 13, 2014. They reside in Chicago, Illinois.

Filmography

Bibliography 
 Crazy Is My Superpower: How I Triumphed by Breaking Bones, Breaking Hearts, and Breaking the Rules (Crown Archetype, 2017)
 GLOW vs. The Babyface, with Aimee Garcia, illustrated by Hannah Templer (IDW Publishing, June 2020)
 Wonder Woman: Black and Gold #1: "Mother's Daughter", illustrated by Ming Doyle (co-feature, DC Comics, June 2021)
 Dungeons & Dragons: At the Spine of the World, with Aimee Garcia, illustrated by Martin Coccolo and Katrina Mae Hao (IDW Publishing, July 2021)

Championships and accomplishments 

 Florida Championship Wrestling
 FCW Divas Championship (1 time)
 Queen of FCW (1 time)
 Guinness World Records
 World record: Most wins of the WWE Divas Championship (3 times) 
 Pro Wrestling Illustrated
 Woman of the Year (2012–2014)
 Ranked No. 2 of the top 50 female wrestlers in the PWI Female 50 in 2014
 Women Superstars Uncensored
 WSU Tag Team Championship (1 time) – with Brooke Carter
 WSU/NWS King and Queen of the Ring (2009) – with Jay Lethal
 Wrestling Observer Newsletter
 Worst Worked Match of the Year (2013) 
 WWE
 WWE Divas Championship (3 times)
 Slammy Award (3 times)
 Diva of the Year (2012, 2014)
 Kiss of the Year (2012) – with John Cena

Notes

References

Further reading

External links 

 
 
 
 

1987 births
American female professional wrestlers
American people of Puerto Rican descent
American women memoirists
American memoirists
Living people
Memorial High School (West New York, New Jersey) alumni
People from West New York, New Jersey
People with bipolar disorder
Professional wrestlers from New Jersey
Professional wrestling authority figures
Sportspeople from Chicago
Sportspeople from Union City, New Jersey
Tisch School of the Arts alumni
Writers from New Jersey
People from Union City, New Jersey
21st-century professional wrestlers
WWE Divas Champions
FCW Divas Champions
Queen of FCW